Zarechnoye is a rural locality (a selo) and the administrative center of Ozeryansky Selsoviet of Belogorsky District, Amur Oblast, Russia. The population was 393 as of 2018. There are 12 streets.

Geography 
Zarechnoye is located on the right bank of the Bureya River, 46 km south of Belogorsk (the district's administrative centre) by road. Chernetcheno is the nearest rural locality.

References 

Rural localities in Belogorsky District